was a Japanese entrepreneur and politician during the prewar period. He served as Minister of Commerce and Industry (1924), Minister of Finance (1927), and a member of the House of Peers (1930-1934).

Biography
Kataoka was born on October 13, 1859 in Tosa Province (present-day Kōchi Prefecture). He served as an official in the police department of Shiga Prefecture. In 1880, he was transferred to Tokyo, where he caught the attention of Itō Hirobumi and was recruited into the Home Ministry. However, in 1889, Kataoka was recruited away from a career to accept the post of vice president of Nippon Life Insurance Company, and subsequently served as president of the company from 1903–1919. He was also president of the Miyako Hotels chain from 1915, and served as a member of the board for the Kyōdō Bank and Kansai Railways.

Kataoka returned to political life as a member of the Lower House of the Diet of Japan in the 1892 General Election, and was subsequently re-elected eight times. A political ally of Katsura Tarō, he joined Katsura’s Rikken Dōshikai political party in 1913 and subsequently served as a senior official in the Kenseikai. As a politician, he was sympathetic to labor relations issues, advocating a government-run worker’s insurance plan and an easing of police restrictions on labor protests.

Kataoka joined the cabinet during the 2nd administration of Prime Minister Katō Takaaki as Minister of Commerce and Industry in 1924. He later served as Minister of Finance under the 1st cabinet of Wakatsuki Reijirō in 1927. However, his public proclamation during budgetary deliberations on March 14, 1927 that the Tokyo Watanabe Bank had gone bankrupt, when in fact it had not, resulted a bank run and was one of the main factors behind the Shōwa financial crisis and the collapse of the Wakatsuki administration.

Kataoka was awarded with a seat in the House of Peers from 1930. He died on May 21, 1934.

References

1859 births
1934 deaths
People from Tosa Domain
Members of the House of Peers (Japan)
Ministers of Finance of Japan
Government ministers of Japan
Members of the House of Representatives (Empire of Japan)
Rikken Dōshikai politicians
Kenseikai politicians
Nippon Life